The men's 110 metres hurdles competition at the 2012 Summer Olympics in London, United Kingdom was held at the Olympic Stadium on 7–8 August. Fifty-three athletes from 33 nations competed. The event was won by Aries Merritt of the United States, the nation's first championship in the event since 1996 and 19th overall. Hansle Parchment's bronze was Jamaica's first medal in the men's high hurdles.

Summary

The qualifying round was notable for who was eliminated. In heat 3, Shamar Sands was in the lead until he hit the sixth hurdle, crashing into the next hurdle and somersaulting into a heap, making him one of three athletes in that heat not to make it to the finish line. In the fifth heat, Aries Merritt ran the fastest qualifying time by far with a 13.07. In the final heat, 2004 gold medalist Liu Xiang reminded viewers of his 2008 performance, failing to clear the first hurdle, and injuring his right achilles. After a minute on the track, Liu got up onto his left leg and hopped off the track. Refusing a wheelchair assist and medical attention, he returned to the track and hopped all the way to the final hurdle. Returning to his assigned lane 4, Liu kissed the top of the tenth hurdle, perhaps signifying the end of his Olympic career. He then hopped across the finish line, where he was assisted off the track by heat winner Andy Turner, Balázs Baji and Jackson Quiñónez.

The semifinal round was again dominated by Merritt running a 12.94. World record holder and defending champion Dayron Robles led Hansle Parchment to the Jamaican national record in 13.14. 13.31 qualified on time.

In the final, Robles and Merritt got the fastest starts but Merritt pulled ahead at hurdle 3, by hurdle 5 Robles was wincing in pain, pushing over the sixth hurdle and holding his leg.  Merritt continued to a personal best 12.92 and a .12 win over reigning world champion Jason Richardson.  Parchment took another .02 off his national record for the bronze, the rest of the field was not even close, more than a quarter of a second behind.

Merritt moves past Renaldo Nehemiah to become the #7 hurdler of all time.

Background

This was the 27th appearance of the event, which is one of 12 athletics events to have been held at every Summer Olympics. Five finalists from 2008 returned: gold medalist Dayron Robles of Cuba, fourth-place finisher Ladji Doucouré of France, fifth-place finisher Artur Noga of Poland, seventh-place finisher Richard Phillips of Jamaica, and eighth-place finisher Jackson Quiñónez of Spain. The 2004 gold medalist Liu Xiang of China, who had been unable to run in the first round in 2008 due to injury, also returned. Favorites included Liu (who had taken second at the 2011 world championships), Robles (who still held the world record), Jason Richardson of the United States (who was the 2011 world champion), and Aries Merritt of the United States (who was undefeated in 2012, including the world indoor championships).

Honduras, Iran, and Lebanon each made their first appearance in the event. The United States made its 26th appearance, most of any nation (having missed only the boycotted 1980 Games).

Qualification

A National Olympic Committee (NOC) could enter up to 3 qualified athletes in the men's 110 metres  hurdles event if all athletes met the A standard, or 1 athlete if they met the B standard. The maximum number of athletes per nation had been set at 3 since the 1930 Olympic Congress. The qualifying time standards could be obtained in various meets during the qualifying period that had the approval of the IAAF. Only outdoor meets, not indoor meets, were eligible. The A standard for the 2012 men's 110 metres hurdles was 13.52 seconds; the B standard was 13.60 seconds. The qualifying period for was from 1 May 2011 to 8 July 2012. NOCs could also have an athlete enter the 110 metres hurdles through a universality place. NOCs could enter one male athlete in an athletics event, regardless of time, if they had no male athletes meeting the qualifying A or B standards in any men's athletic event.

Competition format

Despite a larger field than past years, the competition narrowed from four rounds to three. The men's 110 metres hurdles competition consisted of heats (Round 1), semifinals, and a final. The fastest competitors from each race in the heats qualified for the semifinals along with the fastest overall competitors not already qualified that were required to fill the available spaces in the semifinals.

Records

Prior to this competition, the existing world and Olympic records were as follows:

The following national record was set during this competition.

Schedule

After two Games in which all rounds were on separate days, the 2012 schedule returned to having the semifinals and final on the same day.

All times are British Summer Time (UTC+1)

Results

Round 1

Qual. rule: first 3 of each heat (Q) plus the 6 fastest times (q) qualified.

Heat 1

Heat 2

Heat 3

Ali Kamé was disqualified for false starting. Andrew Pozzi failed to finish the race. Shamar Sands crashed over the sixth hurdle; he eventually finished but was officially disqualified for not jumping each hurdle. Doucouré was obstructed by Sands and advanced to the semifinals.

Heat 4

Heat 5

Heat 6

Semifinals

Qual. rule: first 2 of each heat (Q) plus the 2 fastest times (q) qualified.

Semifinal 1

Heat 2

Heat 3

Final

References

Athletics at the 2012 Summer Olympics
Sprint hurdles at the Olympics
Men's events at the 2012 Summer Olympics